Xinghua Road (兴华路) may refer to:

Xinghua Road Subdistrict, Gaobeidian, a subdistrict in Gaobeidian, Hebei, China
Xinghua Road Subdistrict, Qingdao, a subdistrict in Licang District, Qingdao, Shandong, China
Xinghua Road, Shenzhen, a road in Shenzhen, Guangdong, China

See also
Xinghua (disambiguation)